Justice Howe may refer to:

John H. Howe (judge) (1801–1873), chief justice of the Wyoming Territorial Supreme Court
Richard C. Howe (born 1924), associate justice and chief justice of the Utah Supreme Court
Timothy O. Howe (1816–1883), associate justice of the Wisconsin Supreme Court
William Wirt Howe (1833–1909), associate justice of the Louisiana Supreme Court